Smallwood State Park is a public recreation and historic preservation area located on Mattawoman Creek near Marbury, Charles County, Maryland. The state park preserves Smallwood's Retreat, the plantation home of former Continental Army officer and Governor of Maryland,  Major General William Smallwood. The park's  include a marina, boat ramps, picnicking facilities, campsites, cabins, trails, and nature center.

History
After a succession of occupants left Smallwood's Retreat in ruins, a local citizens group organized in 1934 to see to its protection. Restoration took place between 1954 and the dedication of the original thirty-acre state park in 1958.

Gallery

References

External links

Smallwood State Park Maryland Department of Natural Resources
Smallwood State Park Map Maryland Department of Natural Resources

State parks of Maryland
Historic house museums in Maryland
Museums in Charles County, Maryland
Parks in Charles County, Maryland
Houses in Charles County, Maryland
Protected areas established in 1958
1958 establishments in Maryland